Edward George Wares (March 19, 1915 – February 29, 1992) was a Canadian professional ice hockey player who played 324 games in the National Hockey League with the New York Rangers, Detroit Red Wings, and Chicago Black Hawks between 1937 and 1947. He won the Stanley Cup in 1943 with the Red Wings.

Wares was born in Calgary, Alberta.

Career statistics

Regular season and playoffs

External links
 

1915 births
1992 deaths
Canadian expatriate ice hockey players in the United States
Canadian ice hockey right wingers
Chicago Blackhawks players
Cleveland Barons (1937–1973) players
Detroit Red Wings players
Kansas City Pla-Mors players
Indianapolis Capitals players
New York Rangers players
Philadelphia Ramblers players
Ice hockey people from Calgary
Stanley Cup champions
Vancouver Canucks (WHL) players
Western International Hockey League players